Meilin may refer to:

People 
Gada Meilin (1892–1931), or Gada Meiren, Inner Mongolian leader
Han Meilin (born 1936), Chinese artist
Ong Mei Lin, Malaysian swimmer who competed at the 1972 Summer Olympics
Shi Meilin (fl. 1970s), Chinese tai chi practitioner
Meilin Gray (born 1989), American singer based in Beijing
Meilin Miranda, pen name of American writer Lynn Siprelle

Fictional characters 
 Meilin Li (or Meilin Rae), a supporting character from the anime Cardcaptor Sakura
 Mei Lin Barnes, a character from the animated TV series Arthur
 Mey-Rin (or Meilin), a character from the manga and anime series Black Butler
 Meilin Lee, the main character from the 2022 Disney-Pixar film Turning Red

Places 
Meilin Line, a line of the Shenzhen Metro, China
Meilin, Gan County (梅林镇), a town in Jiangxi, China
Meilin, Fengcheng, Jiangxi (梅林镇), a town in Fengcheng, Jiangxi, China
Meilin, Wuhua County, a town in Guangdong Province, China

See also
Meiling (disambiguation)
Mei Lin (disambiguation)